The 2011 Ontario general election was held on October 6, 2011, to elect members of the 40th Legislative Assembly of Ontario. The Ontario Liberal Party was elected to a minority government, with the Progressive Conservative Party of Ontario (PC Party) serving as the Official Opposition and the Ontario New Democratic Party (NDP) serving as a third party. In the final result, Premier McGuinty's party fell one seat short of winning a majority government.

Under amendments passed by the Legislature in December 2005, Ontario elections are now held on fixed dates: the first Thursday of October every four years. The writ of election was issued by Lieutenant Governor David Onley on September 7, 2011.

The election saw a then–record low voter turnout of 48.2%, only to be surpassed by the 2022 Ontario general election with 43.53%.

Timeline
2007
 October 10, 2007: Elections held for members of the Ontario Legislature in the 39th Legislative Assembly of Ontario.
 November 29, 2007: The 39th Legislative Assembly of Ontario officially opens with the Speech from the Throne.

2008
 February 23, 2008: John Tory's continued leadership of the Progressive Conservative party is endorsed by 66.9% of delegates at a leadership review.
 June 14, 2008: Premier Dalton McGuinty receives the support of 95.4% of delegates from the Ontario Liberal Party's mandatory leadership review.
 June 14, 2008: NDP leader Howard Hampton announces he will be stepping down as party leader at the March 7, 2009 NDP leadership convention.

2009
 January 9, 2009: Progressive Conservative MPP Laurie Scott announces her resignation from the legislature to allow party leader John Tory, who has been without a seat since his defeat in Don Valley West in the 2007 election, to re-enter the legislature.
 March 5, 2009: In the Haliburton—Kawartha Lakes—Brock by-election following Scott's resignation, Tory is defeated by Liberal candidate Rick Johnson.
 March 6, 2009: John Tory resigns as Progressive Conservative leader pending the selection of an interim party leader.
 March 7, 2009: Andrea Horwath is elected leader of the Ontario NDP at the party's 2009 leadership convention.
 June 27, 2009: Tim Hudak is elected leader of the Progressive Conservative party at its 2009 leadership election and also becomes the new Leader of the Opposition.
 September 17, 2009: Eric Hoskins is elected as the MPP for the riding of St. Paul's following the resignation of Michael Bryant on June 7, 2009.
 November 4, 2009: Mike Schreiner is affirmed as the new leader of the Green Party of Ontario, receiving 97% approval from the party membership defeating the None of the Above ballot option, in the 2009 leadership election.

2010
 January 29, 2010: Bob Runciman resigns his seat to accept appointment to the Senate of Canada.
 February 1, 2010: Jim Watson resigns his seat to run for Mayor in the 2010 Ottawa municipal election
 February 4, 2010: Glen Murray is elected as the MPP for the riding of Toronto Centre following the resignation of George Smitherman on January 4, 2010.
 March 4, 2010: Bob Chiarelli is elected as the MPP for the riding of Ottawa West—Nepean and Steve Clark is elected as the MPP for the riding of Leeds—Grenville.
 December 16, 2010: Peter Fonseca resigned from cabinet to run for the federal Liberals in the riding of Mississauga East—Cooksville in the 2011 federal election.

2011
 June 3, 2011: Essex MPP Bruce Crozier dies of an aortic aneurysm.
 September 7, 2011: Official election call, Premier McGuinty formally asks the Lt. Governor to dissolve the legislature. The campaign will be 29 days long.
 September 21–30, 2011: Advance polling stations open for early voting from 10:00 a.m. until 8:00 p.m.
 September 27, 2011: The televised Leaders debate aired on CBC, CHCH, CTV, Global, TVOntario and Sun News Network, with Liberal leader and Premier Dalton McGuinty, Progressive Conservative leader Tim Hudak and New Democratic Party leader Andrea Horwath.
 October 6, 2011: Ontario general election from 9:00 a.m. until 9:00 p.m. EDT (8:00 a.m. to 8:00 p.m. CDT in north-western part of the province).

Party leadership
In March 2009, PC Party leader John Tory stepped down as leader, with Tim Hudak elected to be his successor. Also in March 2009, Andrea Horwath replaced Howard Hampton as leader of the NDP at the leadership election. Thus, both the Progressive Conservatives and the NDP went into the election with a new leader. Green Party of Ontario leader Frank de Jong stepped down in November 2009; their leadership convention confirmed Mike Schreiner as their new leader. Dalton McGuinty won 95 percent support for his leadership at an Ontario Liberal annual general meeting after the 2007 election, and ran again in 2011.

Party standings

Summary

Regional analysis

Detailed analysis

|- style="background-color:#CCCCCC"
!rowspan="2" colspan="2" style="text-align:left;"|Party
!rowspan="2" style="text-align:left;"|Party leader
!rowspan="2"|Candidates
!colspan="4" style="text-align:center;"|Seats
!colspan="3" style="text-align:center;"|Popular vote
|- style="background-color:#CCCCCC"
| style="text-align:center;" | 2007 
| style="text-align:center;" | Dissol. 
| style="text-align:center;" | 2011 
| style="text-align:center;" |Change
| style="text-align:center;" |#
| style="text-align:center;" |%
| style="text-align:center;" |Change

| style="text-align:left;" |Dalton McGuinty
| style="text-align:right;" |107
| style="text-align:right;" |71
| style="text-align:right;" |70
| style="text-align:right;" |53
| style="text-align:right;" |-18
| style="text-align:right;" | 1,625,102
| style="text-align:right;" | 37.65%
| style="text-align:right;" | -4.7%

| style="text-align:left;" |Tim Hudak
| style="text-align:right;" |107
| style="text-align:right;" |26
| style="text-align:right;" |25
| style="text-align:right;" |37
| style="text-align:right;" |+11
| style="text-align:right;" | 1,530,076
| style="text-align:right;" | 35.45%
| style="text-align:right;" | +3.8%

| style="text-align:left;" |Andrea Horwath
| style="text-align:right;" |107
| style="text-align:right;" |10
| style="text-align:right;" |10
| style="text-align:right;" |17
| style="text-align:right;" |+7
| style="text-align:right;" | 981,508
| style="text-align:right;" | 22.74%
| style="text-align:right;" | +5.9%

| style="text-align:left;" |Mike Schreiner
| style="text-align:right;" |107
| style="text-align:right;" |-
| style="text-align:right;" |-
| style="text-align:right;" |
| style="text-align:right;" |
| style="text-align:right;" | 126,021
| style="text-align:right;" | 2.92%
| style="text-align:right;" | -5.1%

| style="text-align:left;" |Sam Apelbaum
| style="text-align:right;" |51
| style="text-align:right;" |-
| style="text-align:right;" |-
| style="text-align:right;" |
| style="text-align:right;" |
| style="text-align:right;" | 19,447
| style="text-align:right;" | 0.45%
| style="text-align:right;" | +0.3%

| style="text-align:left;" |Phil Lees
| style="text-align:right;" |31
| style="text-align:right;" |-
| style="text-align:right;" |-
| style="text-align:right;" |
| style="text-align:right;" |
| style="text-align:right;" | 9,524
| style="text-align:right;" | 0.22%
| style="text-align:right;" | -0.6%

| style="text-align:left;" |Paul McKeever
| style="text-align:right;" |57
| style="text-align:right;" |-
| style="text-align:right;" |-
| style="text-align:right;" |
| style="text-align:right;" |
| style="text-align:right;" | 9,253
| style="text-align:right;" | 0.21%
| style="text-align:right;" | +0.1%

| colspan=2 style="text-align:left;" |Independents and no affiliation
| style="text-align:right;" |36
| style="text-align:right;" |-
| style="text-align:right;" |-
| style="text-align:right;" |
| style="text-align:right;" |
| style="text-align:right;" | 9,021
| style="text-align:right;" | 0.21%
| style="text-align:right;" | –    

| style="text-align:left;" |Elizabeth Rowley
| style="text-align:right;" |9
| style="text-align:right;" |-
| style="text-align:right;" |-
| style="text-align:right;" |
| style="text-align:right;" |
| style="text-align:right;" | 1,162
| style="text-align:right;" | 0.03%
| style="text-align:right;" | -0.01%

| style="text-align:left;" |Edward Deibel
| style="text-align:right;" |3
| style="text-align:right;" |-
| style="text-align:right;" |-
| style="text-align:right;" |
| style="text-align:right;" |
| style="text-align:right;" | 676
| style="text-align:right;" | 0.02%
| style="text-align:right;" |  

| style="text-align:left;" |Danish Ahmed
| style="text-align:right;" |4
| style="text-align:right;" |-
| style="text-align:right;" |-
| style="text-align:right;" |
| style="text-align:right;" |
| style="text-align:right;" | 667
| style="text-align:right;" | 0.02%
| style="text-align:right;" | +0.01%

| style="text-align:left;" |Bradley J. Harness
| style="text-align:right;" |4
| style="text-align:right;" |-
| style="text-align:right;" |-
| style="text-align:right;" |
| style="text-align:right;" |
| style="text-align:right;" | 647
| style="text-align:right;" | 0.01%
| style="text-align:right;" | +0.01%

| style="text-align:left;" |Ranvir Dogra
| style="text-align:right;" |4
| style="text-align:right;" |-
| style="text-align:right;" |-
| style="text-align:right;" |
| style="text-align:right;" |
| style="text-align:right;" | 562
| style="text-align:right;" | 0.01%
| style="text-align:right;" |  

| style="text-align:left;" |vacant
| style="text-align:right;" |3
| style="text-align:right;" |-
| style="text-align:right;" |-
| style="text-align:right;" |
| style="text-align:right;" |
| style="text-align:right;" | 559
| style="text-align:right;" | 0.01%
| style="text-align:right;" | –    

| style="text-align:left;" |Michael Laxer
| style="text-align:right;" |5
| style="text-align:right;" |-
| style="text-align:right;" |-
| style="text-align:right;" |
| style="text-align:right;" |
| style="text-align:right;" | 519
| style="text-align:right;" | 0.01%
| style="text-align:right;" |  

| style="text-align:left;" |Kevin Clarke
| style="text-align:right;" |4
| style="text-align:right;" |-
| style="text-align:right;" |-
| style="text-align:right;" |
| style="text-align:right;" |
| style="text-align:right;" | 386
| style="text-align:right;" | < .01%
| style="text-align:right;" |  

| style="text-align:left;" |Paul Figueiras
| style="text-align:right;" |3
| style="text-align:right;" |-
| style="text-align:right;" |-
| style="text-align:right;" |
| style="text-align:right;" |
| style="text-align:right;" | 366
| style="text-align:right;" | < .01%
| style="text-align:right;" |  

| style="text-align:left;" |Trueman Tuck
| style="text-align:right;" |3
| style="text-align:right;" |-
| style="text-align:right;" |-
| style="text-align:right;" |
| style="text-align:right;" |
| style="text-align:right;" | 232
| style="text-align:right;" | < .01%
| style="text-align:right;" | –    

| style="text-align:left;" |Michael Green
| style="text-align:right;" |3
| style="text-align:right;" |-
| style="text-align:right;" |-
| style="text-align:right;" |
| style="text-align:right;" |
| style="text-align:right;" | 188
| style="text-align:right;" | < .01%
| style="text-align:right;" |  

| style="text-align:left;" |Marilyn McCormick
| style="text-align:right;" |2
| style="text-align:right;" |-
| style="text-align:right;" |-
| style="text-align:right;" |
| style="text-align:right;" |
| style="text-align:right;" | 170
| style="text-align:right;" | < .01%
| style="text-align:right;" |  

| style="text-align:left;" |Bahman Yazdanfar
| style="text-align:right;" |3
| style="text-align:right;" |-
| style="text-align:right;" |-
| style="text-align:right;" |
| style="text-align:right;" |
| style="text-align:right;" | 156
| style="text-align:right;" | < .01%
| style="text-align:right;" |  

| style="text-align:left;" | John Turmel
| style="text-align:right;" |2
| style="text-align:right;" |-
| style="text-align:right;" |-
| style="text-align:right;" |
| style="text-align:right;" |
| style="text-align:right;" | 140
| style="text-align:right;" | < .01%
| style="text-align:right;" |  

| style="text-align:left;" colspan="4"|Vacant
| style="text-align:right;" |2
| style="text-align:center;" colspan="5" | 
|-
| style="text-align:left;" colspan="3"|Total
| style="text-align:right;" |655
| style="text-align:right;" |107
| style="text-align:right;" |107
| style="text-align:right;" |107
| style="text-align:right;" | 
| style="text-align:right;" | 4,316,382
| style="text-align:right;" |
| style="text-align:right;" |-2.43%
|-
| colspan="11" style="text-align:left;font-size:90%;" | Source: 
|}

Maps

Candidates and local results

Incumbents not running for reelection

Opinion polls

Media endorsements
Liberals
 Barrie Advance 
 The Globe and Mail 
 Hamilton Spectator 
 Ottawa Citizen 
 Sudbury Star 
 Toronto Star 
 Waterloo Region Record 
 Windsor Star 

Progressive Conservatives
 Brampton Guardian 
 Metroland Durham Region Media Group 
 National Post 

Did not endorse
 Toronto Sun, Ottawa Sun

References

External links

 Elections Ontario
 Elections Ontario, 2011 General Election
 Election Almanac - Ontario Provincial Election 2011
 Detailed interactive map of poll-level results

 
2011
2011 in Ontario
October 2011 events in Canada